Artem Sergeyevich Ovechkin (born 11 July 1986) is a Russian professional road bicycle racer, who most recently rode for UCI Continental team . He was named in the start list for the 2016 Giro d'Italia.

Major results

2007
 5th Overall Way to Pekin
1st Stages 4 & 5 (ITT)
2008
 3rd  Time trial, UEC European Under-23 Road Championships
 10th Time trial, UCI Under-23 Road World Championships
2009
 1st  Time trial, National Road Championships
 1st Duo Normand (with Nikolay Trusov)
2010
 1st Duo Normand (with Alexandre Pliușchin)
 4th Time trial, National Road Championships
 5th Overall Tour of Austria
1st  Young rider classification
 8th Overall Ster Elektrotoer
2011
 4th Time trial, National Road Championships
2012
 4th Overall Grand Prix of Adygeya
2013
 3rd Time trial, National Road Championships
 10th Overall Course de la Solidarité Olympique
2014
 3rd Time trial, National Road Championships
 3rd Duo Normand (with Ivan Balykin)
 7th Overall Tour of Belgium
 10th Overall Tour of Slovenia
2015
 1st  Time trial, National Road Championships
 1st Stage 1 (ITT) Tour of Slovenia
 3rd Grand Prix of Sochi Mayor
 6th Overall Grand Prix of Sochi
 6th Chrono Champenois
2016
 1st Stage 1b (TTT) Settimana Internazionale di Coppi e Bartali
2017
 5th Time trial, National Road Championships
 7th Overall Tour d'Azerbaïdjan
2018
 1st  Time trial, National Road Championships
 1st  Overall Tour de Langkawi
1st Stage 5
 1st  Overall Tour of Antalya
1st Stage 3
 2nd Overall Tour of China II
1st Stage 4 (ITT)
 2nd Overall Tour of Thailand
 4th Overall Tour de Korea
2019
 1st  Time trial, National Road Championships
 4th Overall Tour of China II
1st Prologue
 5th Overall Tour of Iran (Azerbaijan)
 6th Overall Tour of Fuzhou
 7th Overall Tour of China I
2020
 1st  Time trial, National Road Championships
 3rd Overall Tour de Langkawi
 6th Grand Prix World's Best High Altitude
2021
 2nd Time trial, National Road Championships

Grand Tour general classification results timeline

References

External links

 
 
 
 

1986 births
Living people
People from Novosibirsk Oblast
Russian male cyclists
Sportspeople from Novosibirsk Oblast